David Quinlan may refer to:

David Quinlan (singer), Northern Irish Christian singer, naturalized Brazilian.
David Quinlan (film critic)
David Quinlan (rugby union, born 4 January 1978), Blackrock College RFC, Leinster and Northampton Saints inside centre
David Quinlan (rugby union, born 26 January 1978), Shannon RFC number eight